This is a list of Mexican football transfers for the 2018–19 winter transfer window, grouped by club. It includes football transfers related to clubs from the Liga Bancomer MX and the Ascenso MX.

Liga Bancomer MX

América

In:

Out:

Atlas

In:

Out:

BUAP

In:

Out:

Cruz Azul

In:

Out:

Guadalajara

In:

Out:

León

In:

Out:

Monterrey

In:

Out:

Morelia

In:

Out:

Necaxa

In:

Out:

Pachuca

In:

Out:

Puebla

In:

Out:

Querétaro

In:

Out:

Santos Laguna

In:

Out:

Tijuana

In:

Out:

Toluca

In:

Out:

UANL

In:

Out:

UNAM

In:

Out:

Veracruz

In:

Out:

Ascenso MX

Atlante

In:

Out:

Atlético San Luis

In:

Out:

Celaya

In:

Out:

Juárez

In:

Out:

Oaxaca

In:

Out:

Sinaloa

In:

Out:

Sonora

In:

Out:

Tampico Madero

In:

Out:

Tapachula

In:

Out:

UAEM

In:

Out:

UAT

In:

Out:

UdeG

In:

Out:

Venados

In:

Out:

Zacatecas

In:

Out:

Zacatepec

In:

Out:

References 

Winter 2018-19
Mexico
Tran